The women's double trap event at the 2018 Asian Games in Palembang, Indonesia took place on 23 August at the Jakabaring International Shooting Range.

Schedule
All times are Western Indonesia Time (UTC+07:00)

Records

Results

References

External links
Shooting Double Trap Women
 Results at asia-shooting.org

Women's double trap